In Greek mythology, Magnes (/ˈmæɡˌniːz/; Ancient Greek: Μάγνης) was a son of Argos (son of Phrixus) and Perimele (daughter of Admetus). He lived in the region of Thessaly, in the land which men called after him Magnesia. Magnes had a son of remarkable beauty, Hymenaios by the muse Calliope.

Mythology 
When the god Apollo saw the boy Hymenaeus, he was seized with love for him and would not leave the house of Magnes. Because of this, Hermes plotted to get the herd of the cattle belonging to Apollo that were pastured in the same place as the cattle of Admetus.

Notes

References 

Antoninus Liberalis, The Metamorphoses of Antoninus Liberalis translated by Francis Celoria (Routledge 1992). Online version at the Topos Text Project.
Hesiod, Catalogue of Women from Homeric Hymns, Epic Cycle, Homerica translated by Evelyn-White, H G. Loeb Classical Library Volume 57. London: William Heinemann, 1914. Online version at theio.com 
Suida, Suda Encyclopedia translated by Ross Scaife, David Whitehead, William Hutton, Catharine Roth, Jennifer Benedict, Gregory Hays, Malcolm Heath Sean M. Redmond, Nicholas Fincher, Patrick Rourke, Elizabeth Vandiver, Raphael Finkel, Frederick Williams, Carl Widstrand, Robert Dyer, Joseph L. Rife, Oliver Phillips and many others. Online version at the Topos Text Project.
William Smith. A Dictionary of Greek and Roman biography and mythology. London (1873).

Characters in Greek mythology